The 2023 season is Santos FC's 111th season in existence and the club's sixty-fourth consecutive season in the top flight of Brazilian football. As well as the Campeonato Brasileiro, the club competes in the Copa do Brasil and the Campeonato Paulista.

Players

Squad information

Source: SantosFC.com.br (for appearances and goals), Wikipedia players' articles (for international appearances and goals), FPF (for contracts). Players in italic were not registered for the Campeonato Paulista.

Managers

Transfers

Transfers in

Loans in

Transfers out

Loans out

Notes

Competitions

Overview

Campeonato Paulista

Results summary

Group stage

Matches

Copa Sudamericana

Group stage

Campeonato Brasileiro

Results summary

Results by round

League table

Matches

Copa do Brasil

First round

Second round

References

Notes

External links
Official Site 
Official YouTube Channel 

2023
Santos FC